The Munich Metropolitan Region is one of eleven metropolitan regions in Germany, consisting of the agglomeration areas of Munich, Augsburg, Ingolstadt, Landshut, Rosenheim and Landsberg am Lech. It is Germany's fifth most populous metropolitan region after the Rhine-Ruhr Metropolitan-Region, the Frankfurt Rhine-Main-Region, the Berlin-Brandenburg Metropolitan-Region and the Stuttgart Metropolitan-Region.

Metropolitan Region
State: Bavaria
Districts: Lower Bavaria, Upper Bavaria, Swabia
Area: 27,700 km2 (40% of the state of Bavaria)
Population: 5,991,144
GDP: 210 billion euro (53% of the Bavarian GDP)

In comparison to the other ten German Metropolitan Regions, the Munich Metropolitan Region had:

the highest population growth (about 5% from 1997 to 2004)
the largest increase in employment (over 5% from 1997 to 2004)
the highest gross value added per employed person (2003)
the highest tax revenue per inhabitant (2003)

Larger Urban Zone

The Munich Larger Urban Zone (LUZ) as defined by Eurostat's Urban Audit covers an area of 5,500 km2 and in 2004 contained 2,531,706 inhabitants (pop. density 460,31/km2). The Larger Urban Zone covers the following cities and districts:

Stadt München
Landkreis Dachau 
Landkreis Ebersberg 
Landkreis Erding 
Landkreis Freising 
Landkreis Fürstenfeldbruck 
Landkreis Landsberg am Lech 
Landkreis München 
Landkreis Starnberg

References

External links
Official website (German)
Initiative for European Metropolitan Regions in Germany (German)

Metropolitan areas of Germany
Geography of Munich